Fire in Paradise is a 2019 documentary film directed by Zackary Canepari and Drea Cooper and starring Joy Beeson, Beth Bowersox and Abbie DavisHiyori Kon. The film focuses on the 2018 wildfire in Paradise, California, the deadliest and most destructive wildfire in California history.

Release
Fire in Paradise premiered at the 2019 Telluride Film Festival. It also showed at the 2019 Hamptons International Film Festival, where it won the Audience Award for Best Short Film. and was released on November 1, 2019, on Netflix.

References

External links
 
 

2019 documentary films
2019 films
Netflix original documentary films
Films about wildfires
American documentary films
2010s English-language films
2010s American films